Aero Caribbean (Empresa Aerocaribbean SA) was an airline based in Vedado, Plaza de la Revolución, Havana, Cuba. It operated scheduled domestic passenger services to domestic destinations and international services, and charter flights mainly within the Caribbean and South America. Its main base was at José Martí International Airport, Havana.

History
The airline was established in 1982 as Empresa Aero and started operations on 2 December 1982. It was set up by the Cuban government to provide domestic flights and regional charters to supplement national carrier Cubana. It was wholly owned by the government of Cuba. It has since been merged with Cubana de Aviación in 2015.

Destinations
Aero Caribbean operated the following destinations:

Domestic scheduled destinations: Cayo Coco, Havana, Holguín, Santiago de Cuba, Cayo Largo, Nueva Gerona, Varadero.
International scheduled destinations: Cayman Islands, Corn Island, Managua, Mérida, San Pedro Sula, Port-au-Prince, Santo Domingo, Punta Cana, Guatemala City
Former scheduled destinations : Monterrey, Tijuana

Fleet

The Aero Caribbean fleet included the following aircraft (as of November 2012):
3 ATR 42-300
4 ATR 72-212

ON 19 September 2008, the average age of the Aero Caribbean fleet was 15.8 years.

Previously operated
Aerocaribbean had operated the following aircraft in the past:
1 Antonov An-24
2 Antonov An-26
1 Boeing 737-200
2 Douglas DC-3 configured for Y28 passengers
1 Fokker F-27F Friendship configured for Y44 passengers/freight
5 Ilyushin Il-18D/V configured for Y100 passengers/freight (flying Havana-Bahamas and Havana-Caracas)
1 Ilyushin Il-14M configured for Y40 passengers
6 Yakovlev Yak-40 configured for Y30 passengers/freighter
4 Embraer EMB-110 Bandeirante
2 Bristol Britannia

Accidents and incidents

 On 15 November 1992, an Il-18 on a charter flight from Santo Domingo to Havana crashed into the side of mount Isabel de Torres, near San Felipe de Puerto Plata, while on approach to Gregorio Luperón International Airport for an intermediate stop. The plane was flying in IFR conditions and performed a controlled flight into terrain. All 34 on board perished, including the Dominican chess team. The aircraft lost in the accident was the same plane that was filmed in 1986 Soviet disaster film Razmakh krylyev.
 On 4 November 2010, Flight 883, operated by an ATR 72-212, crashed at Guasimal, Cuba, while en route from Santiago de Cuba to Havana. All 61 passengers and 7 crew members were killed. The most likely cause was icing on the wing.

References

External links

 Official website link dead September 2015

Defunct airlines of Cuba
Airlines established in 1982
Airlines disestablished in 2015
Government-owned airlines
1982 establishments in Cuba
2015 disestablishments in Cuba